Marathon is a rural town and locality in the Flinders Shire, Queensland, Australia. Although the town has existed since circa 1916, the locality was created in November 2021.

Geography
The Great Northern railway line passes through the locality, entering from the east (Hughenden) and exiting to the west (Richmond) with the locality served by the following railway stations (from east to west):

 Boree railway station in the east of the locality
 Marathon railway station, serving the town
 Barabon railway station in far west of the locality
The Flinders Highway runs parallel and immediately north of the railway line with two exceptions, at Marathon railway station and Barabon railway station, where it bypasses further north.

The town is in the west of the locality. The town never developed. It lies between the Flinders Highway and the Marathon railway station.

History 
The name Marathon derives from the pastoral run name first used by the lessees in 1863, at the suggestion of William Lempriere Frederick Sheaffe, the Commissioner of Crown Lands Kennedy District, using a Greek historical name. The town of Marathon first appears on a 1916 survey plan.

The Great Northern railway line from Townsville reached Marathon on 15 December 1903.

Before 19 November 2021, the town of Marathon was within the locality of Stamford. However, this arrangement caused confusion, so on 19 November 2021, a new locality of Marathon was created around the town, excising the land from the localities of Dutton River and Stamford.

Education 
There are no schools in Marathon. For students living in the east of the locality, Hughenden State School in neighbouring Hughenden to the east offers primary education and secondary education to Year 10. For students living in the west of the locality, Richmond State School in neighbouring Richmond to the west offers primary education and secondary education to Year 10. For students living in other parts of the locality, the options are distance education and boarding school. There is no school in the vicinity offering secondary schooling to Year 12; again, the options would be distance education and boarding school.

References 

Towns in Queensland
Shire of Flinders (Queensland)
Localities in Queensland